Thomas Meakin Lockwood (1830–1900) was an English architect whose main works are in and around Chester, Cheshire.  He was born in London, and brought up in East Anglia.  He trained in Chester with T. M. Penson, then established his own independent practice in the city in about 1860.  His most important patron was the First Duke of Westminster.  His sons W. T. and P. H. Lockwood joined him as partners in the practice in 1892.  According to the architectural historian Edward Hubbard he is the only 19th-century Chester architect, other than John Douglas, to have acquired a national reputation.  A memorial window to his memory is in the north aisle of St John the Baptist's Church, Chester.

Key

Works

References

Bibliography

Lockwood